Janine Nakao (born March 14, 1987 in Marina, California) is a judoka from United States.

Her home dojo is Bojuka Ryu Judo Club in Marina. She studied at San Jose University where she was member of SJSU Judo team.

She was a member of Pedro’s Judo Center.

Her biggest international success is winning silver medal at 2010 Pan American Judo Championships. She won the USA Judo National Championships in 2008 and 2009 in -63kg weight category. In 2010 became 3rd.  She again won the National Championships in 2011 and 2015 in the -63kg weight division.

Achievements

2009 Rendezvous - Bronze  Montreal, Canada

2009 U.S. Open  Bronze}

2009 World Team Member - Rotterdam, Netherlands

2010 El Salvador World Cup|Bronze  - 63 kg

2010 World Team Member - Tokyo, Japan

2011 Samoa World Cup  Bronze - Apia, Samoa

2011 El Salvador World Cup  Bronze - San Salvador

2011 World Team Member - Paris, France

2013  Continental Open - Silver  Uruguay

References

External links
 
 US Judo
 Facebook (logged)

American female judoka
Living people
1987 births
Sportspeople from Monterey, California
People from Marina, California
21st-century American women